A bellhop is a hotel porter.

"Bellhop" may also refer to:
 The Bell Hop, a 1921 film
 Hop, the Bellhop, a 1919 film
 Bellhops, an American moving company

See also 
 Bellboy (disambiguation)